Ian Mackay (22 March 1922 – 24 March 2020) was an Australian immunologist. He is noted for his work on autoimmune diseases and is considered to have made major contributions to this field.  Ian Mackay is a professor at Monash University and is currently writing a new edition of his textbook on autoimmune disease. His book Intolerant Bodies: A Short History of Autoimmunity (written with Warwick Anderson) won the General History Prize, New South Wales Premier's History Awards 2015.

References

External links
 

1922 births
2020 deaths
Australian immunologists
Fellows of the Australian Academy of Science
WEHI alumni